Howland Jones (May 22, 1868 – October 22, 1959) was an American architect. His work was part of the architecture event in the art competition at the 1932 Summer Olympics.

References

1868 births
1959 deaths
20th-century American architects
Olympic competitors in art competitions
People from Boston